The 1985 Masters (also known as the 1985 Nabisco Masters for sponsorships) was a men's tennis tournament held in Madison Square Garden, New York City, New York, United States in January 1986.  It was the 16th edition of the year-end championships and was part of the 1985 Nabisco Grand Prix. First-seeded Ivan Lendl won the singles title.

Finals

Singles

 Ivan Lendl defeated  Boris Becker, 6–2, 7–6, 6–3
 It was Lendl's 11th singles title of the season and the 53rd of his career.

Doubles

 Stefan Edberg /  Anders Järryd defeated  Joakim Nyström /  Mats Wilander 6–1, 7–6

References

 
Nabisco Masters, 1985
Grand Prix tennis circuit year-end championships
Tennis tournaments in New York City
1986 in American tennis